Domenico Pecile (9 October 1922 – 29 June 2011) was an Italian Prelate of Roman Catholic Church.

Domenico Pecile was born in San Vito di Fagagna, Italy, ordained a priest on 11 July 1948.  Juric was appointed bishop to the Diocese of Latina-Terracina-Sezze-Priverno on 22 December 1983 and ordained bishop on 6 January 1984. Pecile retired on 27 June 1998.

See also
Diocese of Latina-Terracina-Sezze-Priverno

External links
Catholic-Hierarchy
Diocese of Latina-Terracina-Sezze-Priverno 

20th-century Italian Roman Catholic bishops
1922 births
2011 deaths